The 2010 East–West Shrine Game was the 85th staging of the all-star college football exhibition game featuring NCAA Division I Football Bowl Subdivision players. The game featured over 100 players from the 2009 college football season, and prospects for the 2010 Draft of the professional National Football League (NFL), as well as for the United Football League's inaugural draft.  In the week prior to the game, scouts from all 32 NFL teams attended.  The proceeds from the East-West Shrine Game benefit Shriners Hospitals for Children.

Marty Schottenheimer and Romeo Crennel served as the two teams' coaches for the game. The East team won by a 13–10 margin on the strength of a touchdown with just six seconds remaining. Wisconsin defensive end O'Brien Schofield and Northwestern quarterback Mike Kafka, both of the East team, were defensive and offensive MVPs, respectively.

Although no players from this game were chosen in the first round of the NFL Draft and only seven were chosen on the second day of the draft (rounds 2 & 3), a total of 34 participants were selected during the draft's seven rounds.  This includes four selections by the Pittsburgh Steelers and three each by the Philadelphia Eagles and Green Bay Packers.  Three Utah Utes football players and five offensive tackles from this game were selected in the draft.

Game summary

The West team was coached by Schottenheimer and the East by Crennel.  The game was played on January 23, 2010, at 3:00 p.m. local time at Florida Citrus Bowl in Orlando, Florida.  It was the first time the game was played in the state of Florida.  The game had been hosted in California from 1925 through 2005 (with the exception of the 1942 game, held in New Orleans), and in Texas from 2006 through 2009. The game was broadcast on ESPN2.  The combined score of 23 was the lowest since the 14–6 1992 East-West Shrine Game. The total attendance of 8,345 was the lowest in the history of the self-described longest running college all-star game.  During the week before the game was played, the players interacted with general managers and scouts between practices.

In the first half, the East posted two interceptions.  Schofield, who also had three tackles, made an interception of a pass by BYU quarterback Max Hall.  Subsequently, Eskridge also intercepted a pass by Kansas quarterback Todd Reesing. The only first half scoring came on field goals. Joshua Shene of Ole Miss posted field goals of 44 and 40 yards for the East. Texas placekicker Hunter Lawrence had a 47-yarder for the West.  Shene's field goals both came in the final two minutes and fifteen seconds of the first half.

The West took a 10–6 lead with 6:59 left in the game when Hall connected with UCLA fullback Ryan Moya for an 8-yard touchdown pass. A key play on the drive was a 41-yard pass from Hall to Eastern Washington tight end Nathan Overbay as he was cutting across the middle of a wide-open field. BYU's Dennis Pitta then caught a 17 yard reception.

Kafka threw the game-winning touchdown to Penn State tight end Andrew Quarless with six seconds left, resulting in the 13–10 victory over the West.  The touchdown capped an 11-play 55-yard game-winning drive.  The play before the touchdown, Kafka had scrambled out of the grasp of a swarm of defenders for a 9-yard gain.  During the drive Freddie Barnes of Bowling Green caught three consecutive passes of 12, 7, and 10 yards. The final play was set up after Kafka eluded a sack during a 2nd down and 10 yards situation on the West 11-yard line which led to a timeout with 12 seconds left before Kafka connected with Quarless in the back of the end zone.

Kafka was 18 of 27 for 150 yards and Michigan State's Blair White made 7 receptions for 93 yards for the East. Hall was 7 of 12 for 119 yards, a touchdown, and an interception and Pitta recorded 4 receptions for 72 yards for the West. The game saw no one accumulate more than 28 total rushing yards from scrimmage and no run was longer than 16 yards. In addition to the aforementioned players, the defensive standouts for the East on Saturday were Virginia Tech's Kam Chancellor (7 tackles), USF's Kion Wilson (6 tackles, forced fumble) and Ole Miss' Greg Hardy, Jr. (5 tackles, sack).  The West were led by seven tackles from Kansas' Darrell Stuckey and six tackles and three pass breakups from Texas Tech's Jamar Wall.

According to the release from Shriners International Headquarters and several other sources, Schofield and Kafka of the east team were defensive and offensive MVPs, respectively. However, according to the Associated Press press release that was published by ESPN, Sports Illustrated and several other sources, Eskridge was selected as defensive MVP.

Scoring summary

Statistical leaders

Coaching staff

West Team

East Team

Rosters

East team

West team

2010 NFL Draft

Below is a list of the 34 players from this game that were drafted in the 2010 NFL Draft.  The Pittsburgh Steelers drafted four players that they scouted at this game and both the Philadelphia Eagles and the Green Bay Packers scouted three. The Arizona Cardinals, Buffalo Bills, Houston Texans, Tennessee Titans and Baltimore Ravens each selected two.  Five offensive tackles, four defensive tackles, defensive ends, tight ends and wide receivers were drafted from this game.  Three players from the Utah Utes as well as two each from the UCLA Bruins and Kansas Jayhawks were selected.  Although 34 players were selected during the seven round draft, none were selected in the first round, while ten were chosen in the fifth and an additional 7 were chosen in the final seventh round.

The east team's Matt Morencie had already been drafted with the fifth pick of the third round in the 2009 CFL Draft by the BC Lions.  Jordan Sisco  was selected with the first pick in the second round (8th overall) of the 2010 CFL Draft by the Saskatchewan Roughriders.

References

East-West Shrine Game
East–West Shrine Bowl
American football in Orlando, Florida
East-West Shrine Game
2010s in Orlando, Florida
East-West Shrine Game